Shen Hongying or Shum Hung-ying (Cantonese: Shum Hung-ying) (Oct 15, 1871 – January 28, 1935) was a Chinese general in the Old Guangxi Clique during the Republic of China (1912–1949). Shum was given the title of General Hip Wai (協威將軍) by President Li Yuan-hong (黎元洪總統). Shen served as military governor of Guangdong from March 1923 to May 1924 in the Warlord Era. He was in alliance with Wu Peifu. He was defeated by Li Zongren in 1925.

Shen Hongying was born in 1871 and moved to Luorong (雒容) of Guangxi (廣西) from Enping (恩平) of Guangdong (廣東). He had been a bandit and later became a prefecture officer (管帶) in the Qing (清) government. He then served at the Republic government and was promoted to a number of posts, eventually became defence commissioner in the two provinces. He was the Commander-in-Chief of the Frontier Defence of the Third Route Army of Guangdong and Guangxi (粵桂邊防第三路軍總司令), had armed confrontations with the renowned generals Pai Chung-hsi (白崇禧) and Li Tsung-jen (李宗仁) in 1925, and later fled to Hong Kong. When he was a general in the Chinese mainland, he bought a lot of land in Hong Kong. He was a member of the Board of Director of Pok Oi Hospital (博愛醫院) in 1932 and 1933 and its Chairman in 1934.

Following his defeat in the Guangdong–Guangxi War, Shen retired in Hong Kong and built his residence, now referred to as the "General House" (上將府主樓), in the location now known as the village of Fung Kat Heung in Yeun Long, New Territories. He named the village Fung Kat (逢吉), to represent that all bad luck turns into good luck. The Shum Residence has been determined to be a historic building of special merit by the Antiquities Advisory Board (AAB) of Hong Kong, and efforts should be made for its preservation.

Life

His rise in the Old Guangxi Clique 
Shen Hongying was born in a poor family. He was a local bandit in his early years and gradually became the leader. After the Revolution of 1911, in 1911 (3rd year of Xuantong), Shen Hongying was recruited by revolutionaries affiliated with Liu Zhenhuan (刘震寰,1890年－1972年).

In 1912 (the first year of the Republic of China), Shen Hongying was promoted to superintendent. In 1913 (the 2nd year of the Republic of China) the second revolution broke out. Shen Hongying broke away from the revolutionaries and expelled his boss Liu Zhenhuan. As a result, he won praise from Guangxi warlord Lu Rongting and was promoted again. Later, he helped Lu Rongting suppress the rebels and was promoted to commander.

In March 1916 (the fifth year of the Republic of China), during the National Protection War (Third Revolution), Lu Rongting declared independence against Yuan Shikai, who declared himself the Emperor of the Empire of China (1915–1916). Lu Rongting attacked Guangdong General (Supervisor) Long Jiguang, who backed Yuan. Shen Hongying followed Lu Rongting and was appointed as the guardian of Qinlian. In December 1917 (the sixth year of the Republic of China), when Long Jiguang landed in Guangdong again, Lu Rongting organized four armies to fight him. At this time, Shen was appointed as the General Commander of the Third Army. Shen Hongying repelled Long Jiguang.

After this battle, Shen was appointed as General Commander (commander-in-chief) of the Third Army of the Guangdong Guardian Army and Qiongya Guard Envoy. Guardian of the Guangdong Cliff. In the winter of 1919 (the 8th year of the Republic of China), he was stationed in Beijiang and was appointed concurrently as Guardian of South Guangdong, Jiangxi and Hunan Border Defense Supervisor.

Relationship with Sun Wen 
In 1920 (the ninth year of the Republic of China), when Sun Wen and Chen Jiongming attacked Guangdong, Lu Rongting and Shen Hongying were defeated and retreated to Guangxi. Shen Hongying served as the general commander (commander-in-chief) of the 3rd Road Army of the Guangxi Border Defense Army and led three divisions in Hexian and Pingle areas. After that, Lu Rongting attempted to retake Guangdong again. But, in June 1921 (the 10th year of the Republic of China), following Sun Wen's orders, Chen Jiongming counterattacked Guangxi ("Aid to Gui").

At this time, Liu Zhenhuan turned against Lu Rongting. Shen Hongying, who realized that the situation was unfavorable, sent a telegram to Lu Rongting to back down. Shen then took over as the commander-in-chief of the Guangxi army in a rescue attempt to ally with Chen Jiongming. However, Chen Jiongming continued to attack. At a disadvantage, Shen Hongying sought refuge in Hunan Province with Zhao Hengti.

Later, with the support of Wu Peifu of the Beijing government, Shen Hongying was appointed as the commander of the 17th Division of the Beiyang Army. In July 1922 (the eleventh year of the Republic of China), the Guangdong Army in Guangxi Province returned to Guangdong. Shen Hongying was ordered by Wu Peifu to attack Guangdong, but failed. However, in November, Shen Hongying returned to Guangxi Province, occupied Guilin, Liuzhou, and Wuzhou, and regained his position as a leading military officer in Guangxi Province.

On June 16, 1922, Chen Jiongming launched an attack on Sun Wen, and their alliance dissolved. Sun Wen then allied with Liu Zhenhuan and Shen Hongying of the Gui army, Yang Ximin and Fan Shisheng of the Dian army of the Yunnan clique. Shen Hongying was appointed as the commander-in-chief of the Guangxi army. In December, the above-mentioned four generals organized an army to attack Chen Jiongming in Guangzhou. In January 1923 (the twelfth year of the Republic of China), Chen Jiongming was expelled from Guangzhou. As a result, in February, Sun Wen rebuilt the Generalissimo's (Great Marshal's) Mansion in Guangzhou.

Battles over Guangxi 
Shen Hongying was soon contacted by Wu Peifu. In March 1923, the Beijing government appointed Shen Hongying to supervise the aftermath of Guangdong's military affairs. In April, Shen Hongying accepted the appointment and attacked Sun Wen in Guangzhou. However, Sun Wen, Liu Zhenhuan, and Yang Ximin's army counterattacked but were defeated and returned to Guangxi. Shortly afterward, a three-way conflict over Guangxi Province began between Shen Hongying Army, Lu Rongting Army, and Li Zongren's New Guangxi (New Guangxi) Army.

Shen Hongying formed a de facto coalition with the New Guangxi clique to counter the strongest Lu Rongting of the three powers. In April 1924 (the thirteenth year of the Republic of China), Lu Rongting marched into Guilin, surrounded and attacked Shen Hongying. In June, the New Guangxi Clique took the opportunity to attack Lu Rongting's Nanning. In August, Lu Rongting withdrew to Quanzhou, and Shen Hongying occupied Guilin. In September, Shen Hongying succeeded in capturing Quanzhou. Lu Rongting was expelled from Guangxi and was forced to back down in October.

In the following year, in 1925, in skirmishes with the New Guangxi clique, Shen Hongying was gradually forced into a disadvantage. He finally lost Guilin in April of the same year and was soon expelled from Guangxi. Shen escaped to Hong Kong with his family and retired from the military. In his retirement, Shen built a large estate with a mansion and farmlands in Fung Kat Heung, Yuen Long.

In the 23rd year of the Republic of China (1935), he died in Hong Kong on January 28, 1935 at the age of 63. His private cemetery is in Pat Heung off Kam Po Road, adjacent to the Taoism Jiu Xiao Guan (Hong Kong). It covers an area of about 2,000 square meters. There are about ten tombs of various sizes of his wives and descendants. Inscribed in stone, on the "Master Tomb" is "The Tomb of General Xiewei Crowned the Nanfu Monarch" by the decorated general Li Genyuan, who served as the former president of Yunnan Military College (1909), commander-in-chief of the Yunnan-Guangdong United Army, Prime Minister of Agriculture and Commerce of Republic of China (1923-1924), and strategic advisor to Chiang Kai-Shek (1945).

More detailed history and biography 
Shen Hongying (沈鴻英) gained recognition as a military general of Southern China in the provinces of Guangdong and Guangxi. Formerly known as Shen Yaying (沈亞英), he was born in Luorong County, Guangxi on October 15 in the 13th year of Tongzhi in the Qing Dynasty (1874). He was a first generation was Hakka in Jiaying Prefecture (now Meizhou City), Guangdong. As he and his younger brother and older sister became adults and married, and after the birth his eldest son, in order to improve the livelihood of the family, he and his brother worked as farmers. They walked together to the market in neighboring states and counties to sell groceries. He also sold herbal medicines, such as Gaodan Wansan, to supplement his income. After the autumn harvest every year, to pick up the slack, he and his brother each performed one or two sets of Shaolin martial arts to attract the audience. In the winter of the 26th year of Guangxu, when they were opening their stall in Changtang in Liucheng County in Guangxi, they were robbed by subordinates of Qin Shaoqu's regiment. His brother was seriously injured, but Shen escaped injury. To avenge his brother, Shen pursued and killed his attackers then enlisted as a soldier in the Guixiang Army under the command of Huang Zhonghao. A few years later, Shen was promoted to a fifth-grade blue collar (equal to a company commander rank). He resigned shortly after getting acquainted with Li Deshan. On May 11, 30 year of Guangxu, Lu Yafa was in the Liuzhou Uprising. Li Deshan invited them to participate.

Later, he participated in the Guangzhou Uprising on March 29 in Xuantong three years (1911). On August 19 of the same year (October 10th in the Gregorian calendar) the Wuchang Uprising, all provinces responded one after another, and Shen Hongying participated in the Liuzhou Uprising led by the Crown Three. Liu Guxiang had already served as the secretary-general of Guangdong Governor Hu Hanmin, and Wang Guansan had acted as the person in charge when Liu Guxiang and Li Deshan flew to Guangdong and Hong Kong. Therefore, during the Liuzhou Uprising, Shen was promoted to the commander of the rebel army and appointed as the third management belt. After the establishment of the Republic of China, he was promoted to be a group leader in He County. In the spring of the third year of the Republic of China, when the bandits along the border of Hunan and Guangxi were eliminated, and he was promoted to the third commander of Guangxi Central District in Yulin.

Shen participated in the Guangzhou Uprising on March 29 in Xuantong three years (1911). On August 19 of the same year (October 10th in the Gregorian calendar) the Wuchang Uprising, all provinces responded one after another, and Shen Hongying participated in the Liuzhou Uprising led by the Crown Three. Liu Guxiang had already served as the secretary-general of Guangdong Governor Hu Hanmin, and Wang Guansan had acted as the person in charge when Liu Guxiang and Li Deshan flew to Guangdong and Hong Kong. Therefore, during the Liuzhou uprising, he was promoted to the commander of the rebel army. Shen Hongying was appointed as the third management belt. After the establishment of the Republic of China, he was promoted to be a gang leader in He County. In the spring of the third year of the Republic of China, the bandits on the border of Hunan and Guangxi were eliminated, and the third commander of Guangxi Central District was promoted to station in Yulin.

In the fifth year of the Republic of China, Yuan Shikai proclaimed himself emperor, and many provinces expressed opposition and declared independence. Guangxi governor Lu Rongting also telegraphed to declare Guangxi independence and sent troops to defeat Yuan Shikai. Among them, Shen Hongying was sent to the commander of the Gui army to assist Hunan, and he led his troops to the north of Hunan to attack Yuan Pai's Xiang. Du Tang Xiangming.

On July 1 of the sixth year of the Republic of China (1917), Zhang Xun, the governor of Anhui Province, sent troops to Beijing to support the restoration of the throne of Emperor Pu Yi. Members of Congress went south. On September 10, a military government was established to protect the country, and Sun Wen was elected as the general of the navy and army. On January 5 of the 7th year of the Republic of China, Lu Rongting, Mo Rongxin, and others established the "Province Association of Law Protection" in Guangzhou to fight against the military government led by Sun Wen. In August of the same year, Shen Hongying was ordered to move to Shaoguan as the commander of the Third Army to Protect the Country and the Supervisory Office of Guangdong, Jiangxi and Hunan Border Defense.

Due to the division of the Northern and Southern governments, the military leaders of all provinces regarded the central government as nothing but the expansion of personal power. In view of the frustration of the actual situation, Mr. Zhongshan resigned on August 7 in the eighth year of the Republic of China (1919).

Cen Chunxuan also resigned from the post of Chairman of the Seventh President and moved to Shanghai on October 26. After Cen Chunxuan resigned as Chairman of the Seventh President, the southern central government organization invisibly collapsed. The old parliament members held an extraordinary meeting on April 7 in the tenth year of the Republic of China (1921), and elected Mr. Sun Yat-sen as president. After taking office on May 5, Mr. Zhongshan ordered the commander-in-chief of the Guangdong Army, Chen Jiongming, to lead the Guangdong Army into Guangxi to fight against Lu Rongting. Lu Rongting was finally defeated and ran away from Annan.

In the spring of the eleventh year of the Republic of China (1922), Chen Jiongming rebelled, obstructing and destroying President Sun's Northern Expedition. At about 3 o'clock in the morning on June 16, Chen Jiongming commanded Hong Zhaolin and Ye Ju to besiege the presidential palace with more than four thousand troops, shelling the official residence of Yuexiu Building in Guanyin Mountain. To be telegram, calling on the army to rebel. On the 17th, it was changed to Yongfeng, and the Northern Expeditionary army quickly returned to the Guangzhou Jing Rebellion. On the 18th, Shen Hongying replied from Jiangxi that he could return to the Jing Chao of Guangdong. Ji'an led his troops into Guangdong and returned to Guangxi. He was stopped by Chen Jiayou and Li Mingyang of the Hunan Army. He wanted to return to Gannan and was also in charge of Li Liejun Resistance is to retreat to the Guangdong, Jiangxi, and Hunan border areas and find another way out. The Northern Expedition failed to return to Guangzhou Jingnan, so Sun decided to leave Guangzhou temporarily and head to Shanghai on August 9.

Shen Hongying was trapped in the border areas of Guangdong, Jiangxi and Hunan, an unsustainable position. In mid-August, he surrendered to Sun and led his men back to Guangxi from the border of Hunan. Ren, Luzhai, Luorong, Liuzhou area. On December 19, Shen Hongying received a secret order from Shanghai by Sun Wen in Liuzhou, instructing the strategy of attacking Chen Jiongming. The Shen immediately followed the order and informed him to support Mr. Zhongshan's senior generals in Yunnan, Guangxi and Guangdong. On December 20 On the 6th, a meeting was held at the White Horse Temple in Teng County to discuss strategies and cooperation issues for the battle against Chen Jiongming. After the meeting, the various armies immediately launched an operation to join Guangzhou, known in history as the "White Horse League."

On January 16 in the twelfth year of the Republic of China (1923), the Dian, Guangxi and Guangdong allied forces met in Guangzhou. Sun returned to Guangzhou on the 21st to set up the base camp of the General Marshal of the Army and the Navy and assumed the post of General Marshal. On February 24, Sun Wen ordered the designation of Zhaoqing to Wuzhou as the defense area for the Shen army. Shen secretly sent personnel to contact Wu Peifu. On March 20, on the recommendation of Wu Peifu, the Beijing government announced that Shen was the supervisor of Guangdong. The honorary title awarded to Shen Hongying by the Beijing government is "Two first-class Wenhuzhang Xiewei generals," not only the rank of general, but also honors and medals. On April 16, Sun appointed Shen Hongying as the commander-in-chief of the Gui army. On the same day, Shen announced his appointment of the Guangdong supervisor by the Beijing government, and led his troops to attack Guangzhou, using Li Yibiao's department as the forward to attack Guanyin Mountain. Sun commanded Yang Ximin of the Dian Army and Liu Zhenhuan of the Gui Army to meet him. On April 19, the Shen was forced to withdraw from Guangzhou. On May 22, Marshal Sun ordered Shen Hongying, Li Yibiao, and Shen Rongguang to be wanted and to revoke their positions. On the 31st, Li Yibiao led his subordinates to invest in Chen Jiongming, while Shen Hongying led his division back to take control of Guilin.

In December 1923, Lu Rongting, commissioned by the Beijing government, supervised the aftermath of Guangxi. At this time, Guangxi was segregated by the three major forces: Lu Rongting, Shen Hongying, Li Zongren, and Huang Shaohong. In nominal terms, Lu Rongting is still the leader of Guangxi.

On January 8, 1924, Shen Hongying wrote to Sun to express his loyalty, ambition, and oath to obey orders, hoping to clarify the misunderstanding, allowing him to lead his army back to Guangdong to complete the task of rebelling against the Northern Expedition. On February 23, Shen Hongying officially restated of his allegiance to the Generalissimo. Sun was re-appointed as the commander-in-chief of the Gui army and allocated 20,000 yuan in silver and 100,000 bullets. Sun led his troops back to Guangxi to fight against Lu Rongting. On March 1, Sun appointed Shen Hongying as the commander-in-chief of Guangxi. On May 21 of the 13th year of the Republic of China, Shen Hongying obeyed Sun's order to return to Guilin and launched a general attack on Lu Rongting. On September 21, Guangxi Commander-in-Chief Shen Hongying and generals Deng Youwen, Lu Yungao, etc., sent a telegram to Sun, reporting that he would consecutively defeat of Lu Rongting and Han Caifeng on September 12 and 20 and regain Quanzhou. On the 23rd, Guangxi Commander-in-Chief Shen Hongying sent a telegram to Marshal Sun again, reporting that after the army had recovered Guilin, it would recover Lingchuan, Xing'an, Quanzhou and other places in that order and asked for further directions.

On January 3 of the fourteenth year of the Republic of China (1925), Shen Hongying, Commander-in-Chief of the Founding Army of Guangxi, arrived in Pingle. He gathered four divisions in Xiangxian, Zhongshan, Pingle, and Hexian, and attacked Xunzhou and Wuzhou in three routes. He claimed that he was secretly ordered by Mr. Sun Wen to attack Huang Shaohong.  However, Li Zongren and Huang Shaohong defeated Lu Rongting's various ministries on August 13 and already possessed a vast territory, greatly increasing their strength. Therefore, they were very angry at Shen Hongying's actions. After asking the central government for instructions, they completed their deployment in late January and branched out to advance on Shen. Although Shen's army had an advantage in strength and equipment, his strategy and tactics were at a disadvantage. His position was defeated steadily. At the end of May 1925, the main force of the Shen army was finally defeated by a coalition of Li and Huang forces.

The Shen (Shum) clan finally settled in Kam Tin, established Fung Kat Heung north of Sha Po Tsuen, and built a mansion, "General's House." The naming of Fung Kat Heung implies that although the Shen family has gone through hundreds of battles, every evil turns into good fortune.

Anecdotes 
When Shen Hongying first arrived in Hong Kong, he bought a property on Caine Road in Central. Li Fulin (李福林), another retired general and friend who was also in Hong Kong, introduced Shen to a Feng Shui master to help find land to buy and to build a residential estate in the New Territories. Shen Hongying blessed the land, naming it "Feng Jixiang" (pinyin; 逢吉鄉), which means "every evil turns good fortune" (逢凶化吉). Thus, he established the village of Fung Kat Heung in Yuen Long, Hong Kong in 1926.  "Zhennan Hall" (鎮南堂) is inscribed on the gate to main courtyard of the Shum Residence. Shen had seven wives, nine sons, and nine daughters. They lived together in the General House.  Each wife had her own living quarters for herself and her children. In his later years, he converted to Buddhism, studying under Master Maofeng (茂峰法師) in at the Tung Po Monastery (東普陀講寺) in Lo Wai, Tseun Wan District. He is buried in a private family cemetery in Pat Heung.

Bibliography 
 Huang Xiuwei "Shen Hongying" Institute of Modern History, Chinese Academy of Social Sciences. Biography of People of the Republic of China Vol.7. Zhonghua Book Company. 1993. .
 Huang Shaohong. Fifty Memories. Yuelu Publishing House. 1999. .
 Editor-in-Chief of Huang Zongyan's "Lu Xiting" Thank You Book. Ten Southwest Warlords. Shanghai People's Publishing House. 1993. .
 Edited by Mo Jijie and Chen Fulin. History of the New Gui Family Vol.1. Guangxi People's Publishing House. 1991. .
 Edited by Liu Shoulin and others. Chronology of Officials in the Republic of China. Zhonghua Book Company. 1995. .

References 

1871 births
1938 deaths
Governors of Guangdong
People from Liuzhou
Republic of China warlords from Guangxi
Hong Kong people of Hakka descent